Hans Jonsson is a Swedish retired footballer. Jonsson made 41 Allsvenskan appearances for Djurgården and scored 7 goals.

References

Swedish footballers
Allsvenskan players
Djurgårdens IF Fotboll players
Association footballers not categorized by position
Possibly living people
Year of birth missing